Frank Bradley may refer to:

Frank Bradley (baseball) (1918–2002), American Negro leagues baseball player
Frank Howe Bradley (1838–1879), American geologist
Frank M. Bradley, United States Navy admiral
Frank Bradley (drag racer), American Top Fuel racer
Frank Bradley, who named Bechler River
Frank Bradley, a character in The Adventures of Rex and Rinty

See also
Francis Bradley (disambiguation)